Pederson is a patronymic surname meaning "son of Peder".

People with the surname Pederson
 Barry Pederson, Canadian retired player from National Hockey League
 Denis Pederson, Canadian player with the Eisbaren Berlin of the Deutsche Eishockey-Liga; former player National Hockey League
 Don Pederson, state senator, Nebraska Legislature
 Donald Pederson, American electrical engineer and one of the designers of SPICE
 Doug Pederson, American former football quarterback in the NFL
 Duane Pederson, coined the terms Jesus People and Jesus Movement
 Duane C. Pederson, bishop in the Evangelical Lutheran Church in America
 Eli Pederson, Wisconsin state assemblyman
 Jim Pederson (American football), American football player
 Jim Pederson (businessman and politician), American businessman; was Chairman of the Arizona Democratic Party
 Joc Pederson, American baseball player
 Josh Pederson (born 1997), American football player
 Lane Pederson (born 1997), Canadian ice hockey player
 Lena Pedersen (Pederson), Canadian politician, former member Legislative Assembly of Northwest Territories
 Mark Pederson, Canadian former player, National Hockey League
 Martin Pederson, Canadian politician, former leader of the Progressive Conservative Party of Saskatchewan
 Rachel Field, aka Rachel Lyman Field Pedersen, Newbery Medal–winning author
 Red Pedersen, aka Asgar Rye Pederson, Canadian politician, former Speaker of the Assembly, Northwest Territories
 Ron Pederson, Canadian comedian and actor
 Sally Pederson, former lieutenant governor, state of Iowa
 Steve Pederson, athletic director at the University of Nebraska-Lincoln
 Steve Pederson, American sound engineer
 Stu Pederson, American retired player, Los Angeles Dodgers
 Tom Pederson, American former player, National Hockey League
 Tommy Pederson, American musician, composer, trombonist
 Vernon R. Pederson, former Justice on the North Dakota Supreme Court

Fictional characters
 Coach Pederson, played by David Paymer in The Sixth Man

Patronymic surnames